Egan Butcher (born 8 May 2000) is a professional rugby league footballer who plays as a er or  for the Sydney Roosters in the NRL.

Background 
Egan Butcher played his junior rugby league for South Eastern Seagulls in the South Sydney District Junior Rugby Football League competition. Younger sibling of Nat Butcher he followed his brother to the Roosters and was a star performer in the S.G. Ball and Jersey Flegg competitions in 2018. Egan Butcher has spent his last few pre-seasons with the Roosters impressing his coaches and peers.

Playing career

2021 
Butcher began the 2021 season playing for North Sydney in the NSW Cup. In round 12 of the 2021 NRL season, Butcher made his first grade debut for the Sydney Roosters against Canberra.  Butcher played a total of 15 games for the Sydney Roosters in the 2021 NRL season including the club's two finals matches.  The Sydney Roosters would be eliminated from the second week of the finals losing to Manly 42–6.

2022
Butcher made 12 appearances for the Sydney Roosters in the 2022 NRL season as the club finished sixth on the table. Butcher played in the Sydney Roosters elimination final loss to arch-rivals South Sydney which ended their season.

References

External links
Sydney Roosters profile

2000 births
Living people
Australian rugby league players
Sydney Roosters players
North Sydney Bears NSW Cup players
Rugby league players from Sydney
Rugby league props